In naval terminology, a destroyer is a fast, manoueverable, long-distance warship intended to escort larger vessels in a fleet, convoy or battle group and defend them against smaller, short-range attackers. Seventeen destroyers have served, or currently serve, in the Indian Navy. Six other destroyers (three R class and three ) have been decommissioned and scrapped.

Although destroyers were introduced during the early 20th century and were widely used by the end of World War II, India had none until 1949. The R-class , built in the United Kingdom, was the first destroyer commissioned in the Indian Navy. Two more of the R-class were later commissioned. Three Hunt-class destroyers were commissioned in 1953 to succeed the R-class destroyers. These ships (all of which were built in the United Kingdom) were decommissioned by 1976, with the Hunt-class  the last.

During the 1980s, India signed an agreement with the Soviet Union for five guided-missile destroyers, built as the Rajput class. The first ship -( - was commissioned on 30 September 1980. Four of the five Rajput-class are still in active service, Ranjit was decommissioned in 2019. The Delhi-class destroyers, built in India, were succeeded by the Kolkata-class in 2014. The three Kolkata-class ships were  commissioned in 2014–2016, with  being the last. An improvement of the Kolkata-class,  (part of the ), was commissioned in 2021. The second ship,  was commissioned in 2022. Two more vessels are planned as part of the Visakhapatnam class, and are under various stages of construction.

Commissioned ships
Ten destroyers from three classes are in active service. A total of three Kolkata-class ships are currently in service with the Indian Navy. The Delhi class were the first destroyers built in India. The  destroyers, which preceded the Delhi class, consists of five ships built in the Soviet Union and were commissioned from 1980 to 1990.

Visakhapatnam-class
The Visakhapatnam class (Project 15B) is a class of stealth guided missile destroyers under construction. An improved version of the Kolkata class and ordered in 2011, the first Visakhapatnam-class ship is expected to be completed in 2018. The first vessel of this class is expected to get commissioned with INS Vikrant and INS Arighat. The class will have enhanced stealth characteristics and state-of-the-art weaponry and sensors, including the long-range Barak 8 surface-to-air missile. The first ship's keel was laid in October 2013. The Visakhapatnam class are armed with a 76 mm main gun and an AK-630 close-in anti-missile gun system.

Kolkata class
The Kolkata class (Project 15A) is a class of guided missile destroyers with stealth technology. By the year 2000, the Indian Navy had redesigned the follow-on Kolkata class to improve technology (including modern stealth characteristics) and in May of that year, approval for the construction was given. Concept and function for Project 15A was framed by the navy's Directorate of Naval Design, while the detailed design was developed by Mazagon Dock Limited (MDL). It consists of three ships (Kolkata, Kochi and Chennai), built by Mazagon Dock Limited, which are the navy's largest destroyers. Due to construction delays and a problem discovered during sea trials, the first ship's commission was postponed from 2010 to 2014.

Although the dimensions of Kolkata-class ships are similar to the previous Delhi class, their weaponry, sensors and helicopter systems have been upgraded.

The ships' main air-defence armament is two 4x8-cell vertical launching systems (VLS) allowing up to 32 Barak 8 (medium- to long-range) missiles. Four AK-630 CIWS are fitted for near defence.

The Kolkata-class ships' primary offensive armament is supersonic BrahMos anti-ship and land-attack missiles. The BrahMos missiles are fitted into a 16-cell universal vertical launcher module (UVLM) allowing one missile per launch silo; all 16 missiles can be fired in salvo. A distinctive armament of the Kolkata class is its  gun forward of the bridge. The 76 mm gun provides limited anti-shipping and anti-air capability in addition to naval gunfire support for land-based operations. For anti-submarine warfare, the class is equipped with a torpedo-launching system (with four torpedo tubes) and two RBU-6000 anti-submarine rocket launchers. Bharat Electronics Limited's electronic modular command and control applications (EMCCA) Mk4 provides combat management.

Delhi class
The Delhi-class vessels are the third-largest warships designed and built in India, after the Kolkata-class destroyers and the s. They were built by Mazagon Dock Limited in Mumbai.

Delhi-class vessels are fitted with flag facilities, enabling them to act as command unit in task groups. The vessels are equipped to enable operation in a nuclear, biological and chemical warfare environment. For primary air defence, Delhi class is fitted with 9K-90 Uragan air-defence system comprising a pair of 3S-90 single-arm launchers and 9M38M1 Shtil missiles. One launcher is installed forward of the bridge and the other atop the dual helicopter hangar. Each launcher carries a 24 missile magazine for a total of 48 rounds. The Delhi class is being upgraded with the Rafael Barak 1 point air defence missile system.

They are equipped with two RBU-6000 anti-submarine rocket launchers with 12 tubes.

Rajput class
The  Rajput-class guided-missile destroyers built for the Indian Navy (also known as Kashin-II class) are modified versions of Soviet Kashin-class destroyers. The ships were built in the former Soviet Union with Indian modifications to the Kashin design. These included the replacement of the helicopter pad in the original design with a flight elevator (to transports flights, aircraft, and helicopters, from hangar deck to flight deck, and changes to the electronics and combat systems. Five units were built for export to India during the 1980s.

The Rajput class inherited its anti-aircraft and anti-submarine warfare roles for aircraft carrier task-force defence against submarines, low-flying aircraft and cruise missiles from the Kashin class.
They were the first ships in the Indian Navy to deploy the BrahMos supersonic cruise-missile systems, deployed during a mid-life refit of the ships. The missile system has four missiles in inclined, bow-mounted launchers (replacing two SS-N-2D Styx AShM launchers in ) and an eight-cell VLS system replacing  and 's aft S-125M (NATO: SA-N-1) SAM launchers. Ranvijay was deployed with an updated vertical launcher for the BrahMos missile. The Indian Navy is planning to upgrade the propulsion of Rajput-class ships with an indigenously-developed Kaveri marine gas turbine (KMGT) engine. The Defence Research and Development Organisation Gas Turbine Research Establishment is developing this engine, which is currently being tested.

Decommissioned ships
All presently-decommissioned Indian Navy destroyers were built in the United Kingdom and Soviet Union. The R-class  was the first destroyer commissioned by the navy; two more R-class ships were later commissioned. Three  destroyers were commissioned in 1953 to succeed the R-class destroyers. The R-class  was decommissioned on 30 June 1973, the first decommissioned destroyer. All the British-built ships were decommissioned by 1976. INS Ranjit became the first ship from the  Rajput-class to be decommissioned. The ship was decommissioned on 6 May 2019.

Rajput class
The  Rajput-class guided-missile destroyers built for the Indian Navy (also known as Kashin-II class) are modified versions of Soviet Kashin-class destroyers. The ships were built in the former Soviet Union with Indian modifications to the Kashin design. These included the replacement of the helicopter pad in the original design with a flight elevator (to transports flights, aircraft, and helicopters, from hangar deck to flight deck, and changes to the electronics and combat systems. Five units were built for export to India during the 1980s.

R class

The R class was a class of sixteen War Emergency Programme destroyers ordered for the Royal Navy in 1940 as the 3rd and 4th Emergency Flotilla. The Q and R class repeated the preceding O and P class, reverting to the larger J, K and N-class hull to allow for increased top weight (maximum permissible weight). Like the O and P classes, they were armed with available weapons: 4.7-inch (120 mm) guns on single mountings allowing only 40° of elevation. As a result, on paper they do not compare favourably with many of their contemporaries. These ships used the Fuze Keeping Clock HA Fire Control Computer. The R class repeated the Qs, except that the officers' accommodation was moved from the traditional right aft to a more accessible location amidships.

Hunt class
The Hunt class was a class of Royal Navy escort destroyer. The first ships were ordered early in 1939 and the class saw extensive service in World War II, particularly on the British east coast and in Mediterranean convoys. The Hunts were modelled on the 1938 escort sloop . The first twenty were ordered in March and April 1939. They were constructed to Admiralty standards (like contemporary destroyers), unlike frigates which followed mercantile practice.

Future ships

Visakhapatnam-class
The Visakhapatnam class (Project 15B) is a class of stealth guided missile destroyers under construction. An improved version of the Kolkata class and ordered in 2011, the first Visakhapatnam-class ship is expected to be completed in 2018. The first vessel of this class is expected to get commissioned with INS Vikrant and INS Arighat. The class will have enhanced stealth characteristics and state-of-the-art weaponry and sensors, including the long-range Barak 8 surface-to-air missile. The first ship's keel was laid in October 2013. The Visakhapatnam class will be armed with a 127 mm main gun and an AK-630 close-in anti-missile gun system.

Project 18
The Indian Navy has planned the Project 18 destroyers for the Indian Navy to be built in the 2030s. The ships are projected to be around 13,000 tons in displacement, and will be multi-role destroyers, capable of anti-air, land attack, anti-submarine, and general escort duties. The Indian Navy plans to build between 5 and 10 ships in the class. The ships are still on the drawing board as of January 2023.

See also
 List of active Indian Navy ships
 Future of the Indian Navy
 List of ships of the Indian Navy
 List of submarines of the Indian Navy
 List of frigates of the Indian Navy

Notes
Footnotes

Citations

References

Further reading

External links
 Indian Navy official website

India
 
Destroyers